RFI may refer to:

Organisations 
Radio France Internationale, a French international radio broadcaster
Rete Ferroviaria Italiana, the Italian railway infrastructure manager
Rifle Factory Ishapore, an arms manufacturing facility at Ichapore, India
Rowing Federation of India, the central body for the sport of rowing in India

Other uses 
Radio-frequency interference
Remote File Inclusion, a type of web application exploit
Request for information, a business process
Request for information (parliamentary procedure), a parliamentary procedure

See also
 Radio-frequency identification or RFID, radio frequency identification